The Hamline School of Business offers graduate degree programs in business administration (MBA), nonprofit management, and public administration, a doctorate in public administration, and undergraduate programs in business administration and economics. In addition, the school offers certificates in public administration and dual and joint degrees. Classes are held on Hamline's Saint Paul, MN campus as well as its campus in Saint Louis Park (near Minneapolis).

External links
 

Business schools in Minnesota
 S
Educational institutions established in 2008
2008 establishments in Minnesota